The 1955 Tour de Romandie was the ninth edition of the Tour de Romandie cycle race and was held from 5 May to 8 May 1955. The race started and finished in Monthey. The race was won by René Strehler.

General classification

References

1955
Tour de Romandie